Baharak may refer to:
 Baharak District, Badakhshan, Afghanistan
 Baharak District, Takhar, Afghanistan